Barbora Bukovská is a Czech-Slovak human rights attorney and activist, known for her work on racial discrimination of Romani people in the Czech Republic and Slovakia. Before anti-discrimination laws were adopted, she initiated the first Czech strategic litigation cases concerning discrimination against Romani people in access to public services, housing, employment and within the criminal justice system, and used the courts to bring a change in the law.

Advocacy
Bukovská is a founder of the Center for Civil and Human Rights, Košice, Slovakia. In 2002, she uncovered a practice of forced sterilization of Romani women in Slovakia in her controversial report "Body and Soul", for which she was criminally prosecuted by the Slovak Government. The Slovak Government rejected the report as unfounded; but it was widely supported and backed up internationally, including by the U.S. Congress Helsinki Commission, the Commissioner for Human Rights of the Council of Europe, Amnesty International and others. Since then, she has been representing victims of this practice in the courts.

In 2009, she won a case, K.H. and Others vs. Slovakia at the European Court for Human Rights (ECHR), concerning access of forcibly sterilized women to their medical documents. Subsequently, she won several cases at the ECHR concerning forced sterilizations:
 On 8 November 2011, the case V. C. vs. Slovakia, which was described as ground-breaking. 
 On 8 February 2012, the case N. B. vs. Slovakia, which concerned the sterilization of a minor. 
 On 13 November 2012, the case I.G. and Others vs. Slovakia, in which the Court reaffirmed its earlier position but also, for the first time, found that the Slovak authorities had failed to properly investigate the crimes committed by staff at the concerned hospitals; this factor had not been addressed in earlier cases.

Further cases are pending at the European and Slovak courts.

Other high-profile cases at the European Court include:
 S. vs Estonia, concerning involuntary admission to a psychiatric clinic.
 Plesó vs. Hungary, concerning forced committal to a psychiatric hospital for "prevention treatment".
 Bures vs. the Czech Republic, in which the Court stated that unauthorized use of restraint in psychiatric hospital constituted inhuman and degrading treatment.
 Sykora vs. the Czech Republic, concerning the removal of the legal capacity and detention in a psychiatric hospital. 
 R.K. vs the Czech Republic, concerning forced sterilization of Romani woman from the Czech Republic.

She received a Woman of the World Award from American magazine Marie Claire in 2004.

In 2006, she published another controversial paper on exploitation of the suffering of victims of human rights violations by international human rights organizations at the Cairo conference of the Open Society Institute; the paper was later re-published by PILnet: The Global Network for Public Interest Law, and Sur Journal.

Personal life
She is the niece of John Bukovsky, the first papal nuncio in the Russian Federation. She volunteers for the Catholic Worker Movement.

References

External links
 Harvard Law Today 
 PILNET
 Hearing of the case of V.C. vs Slovakia at the European Court on 22 March 2011

Living people
Reproductive rights activists
21st-century Slovak lawyers
Slovak feminists
Year of birth missing (living people)
Slovak women lawyers
Czechoslovak lawyers
20th-century Slovak lawyers